The Sweden Olympic football team (also informally known as Sweden national under-23 football team from 1992) is the football team representing Sweden in Olympics and is controlled by the Swedish Football Association. The team has been active since 1984, when the IOC restricted UEFA countries to only include players without FIFA World Cup appearances.

The team qualified for the 1988 and 1992 Olympics, reaching the quarter-finals both times. In the 2016 Olympics, Sweden was eliminated in the group stage. Since 1992, the UEFA European Under-21 Championship acts as the qualification to the Olympics for the European teams. Therefore, the Swedish Olympic team is only active in the event of Sweden qualifying for the Olympics. The team has been coached by Benny Lennartsson (1986–1988), Nisse Andersson (1992) and Håkan Ericson (2016).

Olympic record
Football at the Summer Olympics was first played officially in 1908. The Olympiads between 1896 and 1980 were only open for amateur players. The 1984 and 1988 tournaments were open to players with no appearances in the FIFA World Cup. Since 1992 Olympics, the football event was changed into a tournament for under-23 teams with a maximum of three overage players. See Sweden national football team for competition record from 1908 until 1980.

 Champions   Runners-up   Third place   Fourth place   Tournament held on home soil

Results

1992

2016

Players

2016 Summer Olympics squad
The following 18 players were called up for the 2016 Summer Olympics.

Caps, goals, ages and club information updated as of 10 August 2016.

Alternate players
The following 3 players were listed as alternate players.

Provisional players
The following 16 players were in the provisional squad but weren't selected for the final squad.

Previous squads
 1988 Olympics squad
 1992 Olympics squad
 2016 Olympics squad

Overage players in Olympic Games

See also
 Sweden national football team
 Sweden national under-21 football team
 Sweden national under-20 football team
 Sweden national under-19 football team
 Sweden national under-17 football team
 Sweden national football B team (defunct) 
 Football at the Summer Olympics

References

External links
Team results in 1992

European Olympic national association football teams
Olympic
Foot
1986 establishments in Sweden